Mark Reinier Tajon Luz (born February 8, 1988, in Quezon City, Philippines) is a Filipino actor, model and television personality. He was a former contestant in Pinoy Big Brother: Unlimited.

Biography
Mark Reinier Tajon Luz was raised in Quezon City, Philippines. He is the eldest among his siblings. At the age of 23, he joined the reality show, Pinoy Big Brother: Unlimited.

Pinoy Big Brother: Unlimited
On (Day 43) Mark was forcibly evicted for several violations together with Kim de Guzman. (particularly on his entry on Day 8). Both with two of force evicted elimination Kim and Mark bottom out of Big Brother House.

Acting
After he forced evicted in Pinoy Big Brother: Unlimited both with their love team Kim de Guzman. ABS-CBN considered decision Luz is a new Supporting Role actor in ABS-CBN television TV shows such as Be Careful With My Heart and extended cast to pursue as he can doing for acting in Showbiz, Mark lives in Quezon City where he was born. Resting in his residence because no have a project in ABS-CBN.

Television

References

External links
 
 
 

1988 births
Living people
Filipino male television actors
Filipino male models
Star Magic
ABS-CBN personalities
People from Quezon City
Male actors from Metro Manila
Pinoy Big Brother contestants